The 2019 Durham mayoral election was held on November 5, 2019 to elect the mayor of Durham, North Carolina. Steve Schewel was elected to a second term as mayor.

The only other candidate to file to run before the deadline was Sylvester Williams, a pastor who also ran for mayor in 2011, 2013, and 2017. Because only two candidates filed to run, the October primary election was cancelled.

Candidates
Steve Schewel, mayor of Durham since 2017
Sylvester Williams, candidate for mayor in 2011, 2013, and 2017

Results

References 

Durham
Mayoral elections in Durham, North Carolina
Durham